Afrocrania is a genus of beetles belonging to the family Chrysomelidae. It is distributed in the Afrotropical realm.

Species
The genus contains 16 species:

 Afrocrania aequatoriana 
 Afrocrania assimilis 
 Afrocrania famularis 
 Afrocrania foveolata 
 Afrocrania kaethae 
 Afrocrania kakamegaensis 
 Afrocrania latifrons 
 Afrocrania longicornis 
 Afrocrania luciae 
 Afrocrania minima 
 Afrocrania nigra 
 Afrocrania occidentalis 
 Afrocrania pallida 
 Afrocrania pauli 
 Afrocrania ubatubae 
 Afrocrania weisei

References

Galerucinae
Chrysomelidae genera
Beetles of Africa